The Liberal Democrat Home Affairs spokesperson is the spokesperson for the Liberal Democrats on matters relating to the work of the Home Secretary and Home Office. The office holder is a member of the Liberal Democrat frontbench team. The post exists when the Liberal Democrats are in opposition, but not when they in government, for example during the Cameron–Clegg coalition.

The position is also sometimes called the Liberal Democrat shadow home secretary.

List of Home Affairs spokespersons

Spokespersons for Home Affairs in the House of Lords
Spokespersons for the Liberal Democrats on Home Affairs in the House of Lords:

See also
 Liberal Democrat frontbench team

References

Home Affairs spokesman, Liberal Democrat
Liberal Democrats (UK) frontbench team